Ambodimanga may refer to several communes in Madagascar:
 Ambodimanga in Ambanja District, Diana Region
 Ambodimanga in Andapa District, Sava Region
 Ambodimanga II in Fenerive Est District, Analanjirofo Region
 Ambodimanga, Amparafaravola, a municipality in Alaotra-Mangoro
 Ambodimanga, Zafindrafady, a municipality in Fitovinany
 Ambodimanga Rantabe, a municipality in Analanjirofo, Maroantsetra (district)